Sean Lavery (1931–1999) was a Roman Catholic priest for the Missionary Society of St. Columban ("The Columbans") and a church music director.

Lavery was born in Lurgan, County Armagh.

Shortly after his ordination in 1954, Father Lavery moved to the United States where he graduated from Manhattanville College, New York, with a degree in music.  He was transferred overseas and appointed to the Immaculate Conception Cathedral in Ozamiz in the Philippines.  He held many posts including leading the liturgical and musical development and musical development for the diocese.  As part of this effort, he commissioned the building of a pipe organ in Germany; the organ was exported from Europe and installed in the Cathedral in 1967.  It is one of the few pipe organs in the Philippines. Though hardly intended at the time, this pipe organ has now become one of the singular tourist attractions for Ozamiz City and the Archdiocese of Ozamiz.

Fr. Lavery left the Philippines in 1977 to study for his doctorate in sacred music in Rome.  In 1980, he was transferred to Ireland where he assumed the post of Director of Sacred Music at St Patrick's College, Maynooth.  A prolific composer, Father Lavery was passionate about Gregorian Chant and influenced many future musicians, including Father Liam Lawton, a popular singer/priest in Ireland  He was a member of the Irish Church Music Association and was, from the spring of 1984 to the winter of 1987, editor of Jubilius, a Maynooth publication. He resigned his position to do parish work in Jamaica in 1987, where he rebuilt his church after it was destroyed by Hurricane Gilbert.

Father Lavery died in 1999.  He was buried at the Columban Father House in Navan, County Meath on 29 March 1999. A church hall in Jamaica whose construction was partly financed by Lurgan people was opened in 2001, it was named "The Father Sean Lavery Faith Hall"  in his memory at Savanna -La-Mar.

References

External links 

 Bernad, Miguel S.J. “How An Entire City Built An Organ”, History Against the Landscape. Manila: Solidaridad Publishing House, 1968.

1931 births
1994 deaths
20th-century Filipino Roman Catholic priests
Filipino musicians
People from Lurgan
Manhattanville College alumni
Academics of St Patrick's College, Maynooth